Dardin Shervashidze (d. June 26, 1243) was a Georgian noble in 13th century. He was member of Shervashidze dynasty and duke of Tskhumi (Abkhazia) during the reign of Queen Rusudan of Georgia.

Biography 
Little is known about Dardin's early life, the reign of Abkhazian princes of the Middle Ages are poorly documented by contemporary Georgian sources. Dardin was member of an influential dynasty in Western Georgia and duke in the Georgian province of Abkhazia, probably in the last years of the Georgian Golden Age. In 1243, while Queen Rusudan of Georgia accepted the suzerainty of the Mongol Empire, Dardin, along with other Georgian nobles, such as Pharadavla of Akhaltsikhe offered aid to the Seljuk Sultanate of Rum against the Mongols in 1243. For his courage he had been raised to the position of great honor by the Sultan Kaykhusraw II, and was appointed as a commander of some 3,000 Georgian auxiliaries at the Battle of Köse Dağ in 1243, where the Seljuk Turks were crushed by the Mongol commander Bayju. Shervashidze was killed in the action. The chronicler describes him as a "prominent " and "courageous".

References

Sources 
 Claude Cahen, « Köse Dagh » in Encyclopaedia of Islam, P. Bearman et al. (Brill 2007).

Nobility of Georgia (country)
13th-century people from Georgia (country)
House of Shervashidze
1244 deaths